Politics of the United Arab Emirates take place in a framework of a federal presidential elective constitutional monarchy (a federation of absolute monarchies). The United Arab Emirates (UAE) is a federation of seven constituent monarchies: the Emirates of Abu Dhabi, Ajman, Dubai, Fujairah, Ras al-Khaimah, Sharjah, and Umm al-Quwain.

According to convention, the ruler of Abu Dhabi (Mohamed bin Zayed Al Nahyan) is the President of the United Arab Emirates (despite holding the title of President, the country is not governed as a presidential republic) and the head of state, and the ruler of Dubai is the Prime Minister of the United Arab Emirates, the head of the government. Within the UAE, Dubai has considerable autonomy, and is under Mohammed bin Rashid Al Maktoum's autocratic rule.

The UAE is an authoritarian state. The UAE has been described as a "tribal autocracy" where the seven constituent monarchies are led by tribal rulers in an autocratic fashion. There are no democratically elected institutions, and there is no formal commitment to free speech.

The discovery of oil in Abu Dhabi in 1958 and the country's subsequent oil wealth has defined its politics and economy, as well as shaped its foreign policy behavior.

Executive branch

Administratively, the UAE is a federation of seven emirates, each with its own ruler. The pace of local government reform in each emirate is set primarily by the ruler. Under the provisional constitution of 1971, each emirate reserves considerable powers, including control over mineral rights (notably oil) and revenues. In this milieu, federal powers have developed slowly as each Emirate already had its own existing institutions of government prior to the country's official foundation. The constitution of the United Arab Emirates separates powers into executive, legislative, and judicial branches. Additionally, legislative and executive powers are divided into federal and emirate jurisdictions.

The constitution of the United Arab Emirates established the positions of president (chief of state) and vice president and elected by the rulers of each of the emirates from within (the seven rulers comprise the Federal Supreme Council, which also has an elected chairman and a vice chairman each serving five-year terms); a Council of Ministers (cabinet), led by a prime minister (head of government); a supreme council of rulers; and a 40-member National Assembly (known as the Federal National Council), a consultative body whose members are partially appointed by the emirate rulers and partially elected; and an independent judiciary which includes the Federal Supreme Court. Zayed bin Sultan Al Nahyan was president of the UAE from its foundation until his death on November 2, 2004. His oldest son, Khalifa bin Zayed Al Nahyan, was president until his death May 13, 2022. On 14 May 2022, Sheikh Mohamed bin Zayed Al Nahyan was elected as  the UAE's new president after the death of Sheikh Khalifa bin Zayed Al Nahyan.

Under federal authority, responsibilities include foreign affairs, security and defense, nationality and immigration issues, education, public health, currency, postal, telephone and other communications services, air traffic control, licensing of aircraft, labour relations, banking, delimitation of territorial waters and extradition of criminals. Issues excluded from Articles 120 and 121 of the Constitution are to be under the jurisdiction of respective Emirates and are reaffirmed by Article 116 which states that: ‘the Emirates shall exercise all powers not assigned to the federation by this Constitution’. This is further reiterated by Article 122, which stated that ‘the Emirates shall have jurisdiction in all matters not assigned to the exclusive jurisdiction of the federation, in accordance with the provision of the preceding two Articles’.

Federal Supreme Council
The Federal Supreme Council consists of the individual rulers of the seven emirates. The President and Vice-President are elected by the Supreme Council every five years. Although unofficial, the Presidency is de facto hereditary to the Al Nahyan clan of Abu Dhabi and the Vice-Presidency (and de facto the Prime Minister post) is hereditary to the Al Maktoum clan of Dubai.

Article 47 of the UAE constitution defines the powers of the council's authority in formulation of general policy; legislation on all matters of state; ratification of federal laws and decrees, including those relating to budget and fiscal matters; ratification of international treaties and agreements; and appointment of the prime minister and Supreme Court judges. Decisions are made by majority vote unless relating to substantive issues which require a two-thirds majority vote (five out of seven rulers), which must include Abu Dhabi and Dubai. The Supreme Council also elects the Council of Ministers, while an appointed 40-member Federal National Council, drawn from all the emirates, reviews proposed laws.

Council of Ministers/Cabinet

The Cabinet of United Arab Emirates (also called the Council of Ministers) is a collegial body presided over by the prime minister. It consists of 22 members and is also headed by a prime minister (chosen by the president with consultation). The federal cabinet is the executive authority for the federation. Under the supreme control of the president and supreme council, it manages all internal and foreign affairs of the federation under its constitutional and federal laws. The cabinet consists of cabinet's chairman (Prime Minister of UAE) and two deputies and ministers. The general secretariat shall be handled by the secretary general of the cabinet.

Local politics

The relative prestige and financial influence of each emirate is reflected in the allocation of positions in the federal government. The ruler of Abu Dhabi, whose emirate is the UAE's major oil producer, is president of the UAE. The ruler of Dubai, which is the UAE's commercial center and a former oil producer, is vice president and prime minister.

Since achieving independence in 1971, the UAE has worked to strengthen its federal institutions. Nonetheless, each emirate still retains substantial autonomy, and progress toward greater federal integration has slowed in recent years. A basic concept in the UAE government's development as a federal system is that a significant percentage of each emirate's revenues should be devoted to the UAE central budget.

Although complexity of local government differs depending on size and development of each emirate, most (such as Abu Dhabi, Dubai, Sharjah and Ajman) have their own executive councils chaired by their respective rulers and possessing various departments reflective of federal ministries. Various autonomous agencies also exist such as the Environment Agency, Tourism Authority, Authority for Culture and Heritage, and the Health Authority. Some emirates such as Abu Dhabi may also be divided into two municipalities (the Western and Eastern regions) and its main cities of Abu Dhabi and Al Ain are also administered by their own municipalities with a municipal council. Abu Dhabi and Sharjah also have their own National Consultative Councils with similar local duties and role as the Federal National Council.

It has long been regional tradition for rulers to hold open discussions with their people, be they common, merchants or the elite. Often, this forum is held by the emirate rulers as well as senior family members. This open majlis, or consultation, is held periodically; however, a ruler may also appoint an emir, or wali, to whom concerns may be directed by the general population when necessary. This individual is often considered a leading tribal figure whose trust is placed by his tribe as well as the ruler.

Legislature 

The Federal National Council (al-Majlis al-Watani al-Ittihadi) is the UAE's legislative body and consists of 40 members. The body only has advisory powers. Twenty of the members are indirectly elected by the hand-picked 33% of Emirati citizens who have voting rights through an electoral college, while the other twenty are appointed by the rulers of each emirate. According to Reuters, "the process of selecting the people who can either elect or be elected is opaque."

Political parties are banned.

The FNC is the main consultative body in the UAE and has both a legislative and supervisory role accorded by the Constitution.

Since the council's inception, the following have been selected as speakers:
Thani Abdullah Humaid, Taryam Omran Taryam, Hilal bin Ahmed bin Lootah, Al Haj bin Abdullah Al Muhairbi, Mohammed Khalifa Habtour, Saeed Mohammad Al Gandi, Abdul Aziz Al Ghurair, Mohammad Al-Murr, and Amal Al Qubaisi since 2015.

Federal Judiciary

The Federal Judiciary is a constitutionally completely independent body (under Article 94) and includes the Federal Supreme Court and Courts of First Instance. Supreme Council of Rulers appoints the five judges headed by a president to the Supreme Court. The judges are responsible for deciding if federal laws are constitutional, mediating between inter-emirate disputes. It also possesses the authority to try cases involving cabinet and senior federal officials. Although secular law is applied, the basis of legislation is Sharia (Islamic Law) and involves three of the four schools including (mainly) Maliki, but also the Hanbali and Shafi'i schools.

Criticism
According to Jim Krane "The UAE’s rulers now maintain power and legitimacy by giving generous subsidies to their citizens, known as Emiratis, essentially buying their support. The majority is happy with this unspoken bargain, which holds sway in most of the Gulf. The sheikhs get public backing in return for improvements in living standards, including jobs, homes, health care, and education. Tribal autocracy is one of the oldest ways of organizing society and the only form of governance the UAE has ever known.

On 2 April 2021, 91-year-old German philosopher Jürgen Habermas rejected the Sheikh Zayed Book Award worth 750,000 UAE dirhams prize money. Habermas earlier accepted the award, but later called it “a wrong decision,” which he corrected by rejecting it in April 2021. In a critical statement, Habermas cited his previous unawareness of the fact that the awarding institution had close connections with the existing political system of the country, which is a dictatorship as cited in a 2020 report published by Amnesty International.

Political reform and Arab spring

In early 2007, the United Arab Emirates launched the 'UAE Government Strategy' for the years ahead, which covered twenty-one topics in six different sectors including social development, economic development, public sector development, justice and safety, infrastructure and rural areas development. The initiative is meant to reevaluate and advance these sectors towards top global standards by facilitating better continuous cooperation between federal and local governments with increased efficiency, training, Emiratisaion, ministry empowerment, upgrading of services, improving civil service and legislation review.

Subsequently, Abu Dhabi announced implementation of its own policy to modernize public administration practices and government performance in 2007–2008. Plans for reevaluation were laid out in areas including economy, energy, tourism, health, education, labour, civil services, culture and heritage, good control, urban planning, transport, environment, health and safety, municipal affairs, police and emergency services, electronic government, women and legislative reform. Abu Dhabi hopes advancements towards global standards in these areas will improve the quality of services for its residents as well as attract future investment towards further modernizing the Emirate.

The country did not see the type of trouble other Arab countries saw during the Arab spring. There were minor protests, during which some people were arrested.

International organization affiliations

ABEDA
AfDB
AFESD
AL
AMF 
CAEU
ESCWA
FAO
G-77
GCC
IAEA
IBRD
ICAO
ICRM
IDA
IDB
IFAD
IFC
IFRCS
IHO
ILO
IMF
IMO
Inmarsat
Intelsat
Interpol
IOC
ISO (correspondent)
ITU
NAM
OAPEC
OIC
OPCW
OPEC
United Nations
UNCTAD
UNESCO
UNIDO
UPU
WCO
WHO
WIPO
WMO
WTO

See also
 Fatwa Council (United Arab Emirates)

References

External links

 Dubai Government Information and Services Portal
 
 UAE at Adam Carr's Election Archive
 UAEPrison.com Human Rights problems about UAE
 Politics & Government at EmiratesVoyage.com